Seester (pronounced "sister") is a municipality in the district of Pinneberg, in Schleswig-Holstein, Germany.

References

Municipalities in Schleswig-Holstein
Pinneberg (district)